Jacobo Sánchez López (born 20 October 1955) is a Mexican politician affiliated with the Institutional Revolutionary Party. As of 2014 he served as Deputy of the LIX Legislature of the Mexican Congress representing Oaxaca.

References

1955 births
Living people
Politicians from Oaxaca
Institutional Revolutionary Party politicians
Benito Juárez Autonomous University of Oaxaca alumni
Members of the Congress of Oaxaca
20th-century Mexican politicians
21st-century Mexican politicians
Deputies of the LIX Legislature of Mexico
Members of the Chamber of Deputies (Mexico) for Oaxaca